The 2012 season is the 102nd season in the history of Sport Club Corinthians Paulista. In 2012, Corinthians won its first ever Copa Libertadores title.

Background

Kit 
 Home (2012): White shirt, black shorts and white socks;
 Away (2012): Black shirt, white shorts and black socks.

 Keeper Kits:
Shirt  yellow, shorts and yellow socks.
Shirt  gray, gray shorts and socks.
Shirt  blue, blue shorts and socks.
Shirt  black, black shorts and socks.

Competitions

Overview

Campeonato Paulista

Summary

Results

Colours: Green = Corinthians win; Yellow = draw; Red = opponents win.

Quarterfinals

Source: (Portuguese)

Statistics

Results summary

Pld = Matches played; W = Matches won; D = Matches drawn; L = Matches lost; GF = Goals for; GA = Goals against; GD = Goal difference

Results by round

Copa Libertadores

Summary

Results

Knockout stage

Round of 16

Quarter-finals

Semi-finals

Finals

Campeonato Brasileiro

Summary

Results

Standings

Results summary

FIFA Club World Cup

Matches

Semi-final

Final

Squad
As July 24, 2012.

Jorge Henrique

Statistics

Last Updated June 26, 2012

Discipline

Last Updated June 26, 2012

Transfers

Permanent

Transfer Net:  R$18.75m (€7.5m/$9.4m)

Loan

Manufacturer and sponsors 

Corinthians began the 2012 Season with Johnson & Johnson Brazilian consumer brand Jontex as its main sponsor. When Corinthians initiated the 2012 Libertadores Campaign a month later, Fiat subsidiary Iveco (Chest) became the main sponsor alongside Fisk (Back), Marabraz (Sleeves), & Bom Brill (Shoulders). Prior to the Libertadores Final Iveco approached Corinthians in an attempt to become the exclusive sponsor of Timão, Corinthians rebuffed stating that such a deal would be out of Iveco's financial reach. The latest prices for Corinthians Shirt sponsorships are as follows: (Chest & Back) R$30m (€12m/$15m), Sleeves R$15m (€6m/$7.5m), Shoulders R$8m (€3.2m/$4m), for a total of R$53m (€21.3m/$26.5m). On July 7, 2012, it was announced that Corinthians was close to signing an exclusive sponsorship deal lasting until the end of 2012, worth R$68m (€27.3m/$34m). This would place Corinthians as the second most expensive shirt in the world, ahead of Juventus (Tamoil) & behind Manchester United (Nike).

See also
List of Sport Club Corinthians Paulista seasons

Notes

References

Sport Club Corinthians Paulista seasons
Corinthians
FIFA Club World Cup-winning seasons